Oscar George Theodore Sonneck (October 6, 1873 – October 30, 1928) was a U.S. librarian, editor, and musicologist.

Sonneck was born in Jersey City.  He studied philosophy and musicology in Germany at the universities of Heidelberg and Munich.

From 1902 to 1917, he was head of the music division of the Library of Congress, and as such created a significant music library. Since 1915, he was also editor of The Musical Quarterly. As a writer, he specialized in the history of early (before the 19th century) American music.  He died in New York City, aged 55.

The Society for American Music was created in his honor, and initially named after him.

Works 
 A Bibliography of Early Secular American Music (1905, rev. ed. 1945)
 Early Concert-Life in America (1907)
 Report on "The Star-Spangled Banner", "Hail Columbia", "America", "Yankee Doodle" (1909)
 The Star-Spangled Banner (1914)
 Catalogue of Opera Librettos Printed before 1800 (2 vol., 1914)
 Early Opera in America (1915)
 Vier pessimistische Lieder, op. 17 (Universal-Edition Ä.G., Vienna & New York, 1922)

External links

Sonneck's books at the Internet Archive
Picture of Sonneck

1873 births
1928 deaths
American librarians